Live at the Borderline 1991 is a 2019 live album released for Record Store Day on April13. The recording features alternative rock band R.E.M. performing under the pseudonym Bingo Hand Job at a 1991 surprise gig around the release of Out of Time.

Recording and release
The band played two nights at the 200-capacity London venue (March14–15, 1991) as part of a small promotional tour of radio and television programs; tickets were reportedly exchanging hands for $200 and the gigs were widely bootlegged at the time. This is the first official release. 

Members of R.E.M. were joined by Billy Bragg, Peter Holsapple and Robyn Hitchcock, who also adopted pseudonyms.

The official release was proceeded by a free NoiseTrade download of "Radio Song".

Several of the songs had been released as B-sides on singles such as "Near Wild Heaven".

Track listing
All songs written by Bill Berry, Peter Buck, Mike Mills, and Michael Stipe, except where noted.

Side A
"World Leader Pretend"
"Half a World Away"
"Fretless"
"The One I Love"

Side B
"Jackson"/"Dallas" (Jerry Leiber and Billy Edd Wheeler/Jimmie Dale Gilmore)
"Disturbance at the Heron House"
"Belong"
"Low"

Side C
"Love Is All Around" (Reg Presley)
"You Are the Everything"
"Swan Swan H"
"Radio Song"
"Perfect Circle"

Side D
"Endgame"
”Pop Song 89"
”Losing My Religion"
"Fall on Me"
"Get Up"
"Moon River" (Henry Mancini and Johnny Mercer)

Personnel
Bingo Hand Job
The Doc – drums
Raoul – guitar, mandolin
Ophelia – bass guitar, backing vocals
Stinky – vocals

Additional musicians
Conrad – guitar, vocals on "Jackson", "Dallas", "Disturbance at the Heron House", and "Fall on Me"
Spanish Charlie – guitar, mandolin, backing vocals
Violet – vocals

Technical personnel
Spencer Kelly – project assistance
Tony McGuinness – project assistance
Doug Schwartz – editing and mastering at Mulholland Music

References

External links
Announcement from R.E.M.'s site

2019 live albums
Craft Recordings live albums
R.E.M. live albums
Record Store Day releases